Beech Creek is a tributary of Goose Creek in Clay County in the U.S. state of Kentucky.

Its headwaters are at Combs Lake in the Beech Creek Wildlife Area.

Tributaries and post offices 
The Mount Welcome postoffice was established on 1849-08-29 by postmaster Reuben May, and closed in July 1852.

The Tankersley postoffice was established on 1882-07-31 by husband and wife postmasters James Franklin Tankersley and Drucilla Tankersley.
It was not named for themselves but for James' father, John M. Tankersley (born in 1810 and whose surname was spelled Tankisley in the 1870 census).
It was back at Beech Creek by the time of its closure in 1977.

The Cedral postoffice was established on 1901-04-10 by postmaster Thomas Jefferson Houchell.

Wildlife Area 
The  Beech Creak Wildlife area surrounding Bert T. Combs Lake at the headwaters of Beech Creek is adjacent to the Daniel Boone National Forest and is accessed by road from Littleton, Kentucky, although there are no roads within the wildlife area itself.

It is 94% forest, 4% open land, and 2% open water.

See also
List of rivers of Kentucky

References

Sources

Further reading 

 

Rivers of Kentucky
Rivers of Clay County, Kentucky